Gilberto Ramón Palacios Acosta (born 8 January 1980, in Asunción) is a Paraguayan football striker.

Career
Palacios began playing football with local side Club Olimpia. He won the league with Olimpia from 1998 to 2000 (as the club won four successive league titles).

He has played professional football in Paraguay, Argentina, Chile and Bolivia.

References

External links
 BDFA profile
 Primera División Argentina statistics

1980 births
Living people
Paraguayan footballers
Club Olimpia footballers
Club Guaraní players
Olimpo footballers
Club Deportivo Universidad Católica footballers
Paraguayan expatriate footballers
Expatriate footballers in Bolivia
Expatriate footballers in Chile
Expatriate footballers in Argentina
Association football forwards